The 1984 Santista Textile Open was a women's tennis tournament played on outdoor hard courts in Rio de Janeiro, Brazil that was part of the 1984 Virginia Slims World Championship Series. The tournament was held from 9 July through 15 July 1984. Second-seeded Sandra Cecchini won the singles title.

Finals

Singles
 Sandra Cecchini defeated  Adriana Villagrán-Reami 6–3, 6–3
 It was Cecchini's 2nd singles title of the year and of her career.

Doubles
 Jill Hetherington /  Hélène Pelletier defeated  Penny Barg-Mager /  Kyle Copeland 6–3, 2–6, 7–6
 It was Hetherington's 1st career title. It was Pelletier's only career title.

External links
 ITF tournament edition details

Santista Textile Open
Brasil Open
Santista Textile Open